Andrew Manning (born 23 November 1966) is a former Australian rules footballer who played with St Kilda and Essendon in the Victorian Football League (VFL).

Career
Manning, recruited from Daylesford as a half forward flanker, made his league debut in the 1985 VFL season. The 18-year-old appeared in 19 of a possible 22 games that year, but struggled in subsequent seasons with fitness problems. He played just twice in 1987 and after adding just one further game to his tally in 1988 was dropped from St Kilda's list mid-season.

He joined Essendon for the 1989 season but didn't make his debut until round 18. His second and third appearances for Essendon were a semi and preliminary final. He featured prominently in the semi final loss to Hawthorn, with 18 disposals and goal, as well as being struck by Peter Schwab, an action which cost the future Hawthorn coach a spot in a premiership team. In 1990 he became a regular fixture in the Essendon team and averaged 16 disposals a game. He had just eight disposals in Essendon's preliminary final win over the West Coast Eagles and lost his place in the side for the grand final, to Peter Somerville.

References

1966 births
Australian rules footballers from Victoria (Australia)
St Kilda Football Club players
Essendon Football Club players
Daylesford Football Club players
Living people